is an underground metro station on the Sendai Subway Nanboku Line in Aoba-ku, Sendai, Miyagi Prefecture, Japan

Lines

Station layout
Hirose-dōri Station is an underground station with a single island platform serving two tracks.

Platforms

History
Hirose-dōri Station opened on 15 July 1987. Operations were suspended from 11 March 2011 to 29 April 2012 due to damage sustained by the 2011 Tōhoku earthquake and tsunami.

Passenger statistics
In fiscal 2015, the station was used by an average of 10,672 passengers daily.

Surrounding area
 Clis Road Shopping District
 Sendai City Hirose Post Office
 Sendai City Gas Bureau Showroom
 Tohoku Electric Power headquarters
 FM Sendai Head office

In addition, the area around the station is a commercial district, with many restaurants and shopping opportunities.

References

External links

 

Railway stations in Miyagi Prefecture
Sendai Subway Namboku Line
Railway stations in Japan opened in 1987